Epimelitta postimelina is a species of beetle in the family Cerambycidae. It was described by Giesbert in 1996.

References

Epimelitta
Beetles described in 1996